SV Rödinghausen is a German association football club from the town of Rödinghausen, North Rhine-Westphalia.

The club's greatest success has been to earn promotion to the tier four Regionalliga West in 2014.

History
For most of its history the club has been an amateur side in local football. The club's fortunes changed in 2009 when, after having been playing in the tier nine Kreisliga A for a number of seasons the club began a series of five consecutive promotions. A Kreisliga championship in 2010 was followed by a Bezirksliga championship in 2011 and a Landesliga championship in 2012. The club's rapid rise was made possible by the financial support of Horst Finkemeier, the retired owner of a kitchen manufacturing business. Finkemeier also financed the club's new stadium, which is estimated to have cost €2 million and was officially opened in 2011. The stadium was first used, then still under construction, in a league match against SC Verl but has also seen the club play friendlies against Valencia, Werder Bremen and Aston Villa.

In 2013 SV won Group 1 of the Westfalenliga and thereby earned direct promotion to the Oberliga Westfalen. The following season the club won promotion to the tier four Regionalliga West for the first time after finishing runners-up in the Oberliga, behind the champions Arminia Bielefeld II, who were ineligible for promotion.

Current squad

Honours
The club's honours:
 Oberliga Westfalen
 Runners-up: 2014
 Westfalenliga
 Champions: 2013
 Landesliga Westfalen-Ost
 Champions: 2012
 Bezirksliga Westfalen 1
 Champions: 2011
 Kreisliga A
 Champions: 2010
 Westphalian Cup
 2019, 2022

Recent seasons
The recent season-by-season performance of the club:

With the introduction of the Regionalligas in 1994 and the 3. Liga in 2008 as the new third tier, below the 2. Bundesliga, all leagues below dropped one tier.
1 Rödinghausen declined to be promoted to the 3. Liga.

Key

References

External links
   Official team site
  Das deutsche Fußball-Archiv historical German domestic league tables

Football clubs in Germany
Football clubs in North Rhine-Westphalia
Association football clubs established in 1970
1970 establishments in West Germany